RailNews may refer to:

Railnews, a national newspaper for the British rail industry
RailNews, a defunct American railway magazine, previously named Pacific RailNews